Suehiro-chō (末広町) is a historic neighbourhood located in the Naka ward of Nagoya, central Japan. It is where the present Sakae 2-chome, Sakae 3-chome, Ōsu 2-chome, and Osu 3-chome are located. It received its name in Hōei 5. 

The Suehiro-za (末広座) was a kabuki theatre located there. It was one of the leading theatres in town. 

The Wakamiya Hachiman Shrine is also located there. A large festival is held there every May.

See also 
 Funairi-chō, Nagoya

References

External links 

Naka-ku, Nagoya
Neighbourhoods of Nagoya